Llynclys South is a railway station on the Cambrian Heritage Railways' (CHR) line in Shropshire.

It is located in the heart of the village of Llynclys, just south of Llynclys station, on the other side of the B4396 road bridge. During the original commercial operation of the line, the site was used for goods handling.

The station was built as an alternative to the original Llynclys station, which has become a private house. Work on the South station began in 2004 and opened to the public in 2005. CHR currently keeps the bulk of its rolling stock here, on a number of sidings, and a new carriage shed is set to be built after having gained planning permission in 2007.

A notable historic feature of the site is the surviving bridge abutments from the narrow gauge Crickheath Tramway. It shut in 1932. Towards the bottom of the station's access drive, a small length of 2' 6" gauge track with a display of wagons serves as tribute to the tramway.

External links
Cambrian Heritage Railways Trust website
Video footage and history of the railways

Railway stations in Great Britain opened in 2005
Heritage railway stations in Shropshire
Railway stations built for UK heritage railways